Cartesio Oktató és Szolgáltató bt (2008) C-210/06 is a European company law case concerning the right of freedom of establishment.

Facts
A Hungarian limited partnership wished to transfer its operational headquarters to Italy, but stay subject to Hungarian law. The Hungarian Commercial Court refused to enter the new address in the companies register as it was not possible under Hungarian law. The European Court of Justice was sent a reference under TEC article 234 as to whether the company had a right to transfer its headquarters given TEC articles 43 and 48 (now TFEU articles 49 and 54).

Judgment
The European Court of Justice held that without any applicable EU legislation, the question of whether a company formed under one member state's law could transfer its registered office to another without losing legal personality was a question of national law. The question of whether the company's right of freedom of establishment was restricted only arose under article 43 if it could be established that the company actually had a right to that freedom. This was determined by normal law. On the one hand a company seat change may result in changing applicable national law, and there a barrier to conversion was prohibited under TEC article 43 unless it is shown that the restriction is in the public interest. On the other hand, a company could wish, as here, to change its seat without changing national law, but that would be within the discretion of the national law in question.

In plain words, the press release issue by the European Court of Justice stated the following:

- The Member State of incorporation can prevent a company from transferring its seat to another Member State of the Union.

- On the other hand, the freedom of establishment enables a company to move to another Member State by converting itself into a form of company governed by the law of that State, without having to be wound up or enter into liquidation during its conversion, if the law of the host Member State so permits.

See also

UK company law
European company law
Liggett v. Lee 288 U.S. 517 (1933)

Notes

References
Bank of Augusta v Earle,  Taney CJ, a corporation ‘exists only in contemplation of law’ and ‘can not migrate to another sovereignty’.

External links
The press release issue by the European Court of Justice: 

Corporate case law
Court of Justice of the European Union case law
Hungarian case law
2008 in Hungary
2008 in case law
European Union company case law